Fredrick Smoot (born April 17, 1979) is a former American professional football player who was a cornerback in the National Football League (NFL) for nine seasons.  He played college football for Mississippi State University, and was recognized as an All-American.  The Washington Redskins chose him in the second round of the 2001 NFL Draft, and he also played professionally for the NFL's Minnesota Vikings.

Early years
Smoot was born in Jackson, Mississippi.  He attended Provine High School in Jackson, and played for the Provine Rams high school football team.  He was selected to play in the Mississippi-Alabama high school all-star game as a senior.

College career
Smoot attended Hinds Community College from 1997 to 1998 and Mississippi State University, where he played for the Mississippi State Bulldogs football team from 1999 to 2000.  He started his junior and senior years, and was a first-team All-Southeastern Conference (SEC) selection both years, and a consensus first-team All-American as a senior.  He was also a finalist for the Conerly Trophy in 2000.

Professional career

First stint with Redskins
Smoot was drafted by the Washington Redskins as the 14th pick in the second round (45th pick overall) of the 2001 NFL Draft out of Mississippi State.  Many believed he was a first-round caliber player but because of questionable off-the-field problems many teams shied away from him.  Afterwards, he proclaimed himself to be the steal of the draft.  In Smoot's four years with the Redskins, he collected 16 interceptions, and formed an impressive duo with Champ Bailey.

Minnesota Vikings
Following a strong season as part of the impressive Redskins defense in 2004, Smoot left the club as a free agent to sign with the Minnesota Vikings.  However, he was not able to duplicate his success in Minnesota.

Smoot reportedly bulked up in the 2006 offseason.  His playing weight was listed at 178 lb for the 2005 season and in May 2006 the press reported he weighed about 200 lb.  He faced very stiff competition for the starting spot since the Vikings drafted cornerback Cedric Griffin in the second round and cornerback Ronyell Whitaker was named All NFL Europa.  In the third game of the season against Chicago, Smoot sat out the opening drive reportedly for discipline reasons.  Coach Brad Childress said that was between him and Smoot.  In the 11th game of the season, Smoot was benched in favor of starting Griffin instead.  Childress said the switch was merited in performance and Griffin had been doing an excellent job.

Love Boat scandal
Smoot was at the center of the 2005 Minnesota Vikings boat cruise scandal involving several of his Minnesota Vikings' teammates.  Some Vikings players had rented a boat on Lake Minnetonka and reportedly hired prostitutes to have a "sex party" on the boat.  Smoot allegedly held a purple double-headed dildo and inserted it into the vaginas of two women who were lying on the floor in the lounge area. After one woman left, he continued to "manipulate the dildo" inside the other woman in front of the young crew.  Formal charges for the Boat Scandal were filed on December 15.  Smoot was also alleged to have organized the whole party, an accusation he denied.

On May 2, 2006, Smoot pleaded guilty to disorderly conduct and being a public nuisance on a watercraft in connection with the Love Boat scandal.  He agreed to pay a $1,007 fine and perform 48 hours of community service.  Vikings owner Zygi Wilf said, in addition to community service, he would participate in numerous service events that season.  NFL spokesman Greg Aiello said fines were likely, but Smoot would not be suspended.

On September 9, 2006, the NFL imposed a fine equivalent to one game's salary against Smoot and former Vikings teammate Bryant McKinnie for their role in the Love Boat scandal, Smoot's fine was $82,352.

Car crash
Smoot broke his jaw in a single-vehicle crash in Mississippi on December 22, 2006, where he was spending the week.  His jaw was broken in five different spots.  As a result, he was out for the rest of the season.

Second stint with the Redskins
He was released on March 1, 2007 from the Vikings.  On March 3, 2007, the Redskins signed Smoot to a five-year deal worth $25 million. He was released on March 4, 2010.

Personal life
Smoot has advocated for the passage of the FIT Kids Act, federal legislation that would require school districts to report on students' physical activity while also distributing health and nutritional information.

Domestic violence accusation
On November 25, 2014, Smoot was arrested by the Loudoun County Sheriff’s Office on a domestic abuse charge against his former girlfriend, Valerie Jackson. Smoot was officially cleared of all charges on January 6, 2015.

References

External links
 "One on one with Fred Smoot", HoboTrashcan.com.
 Fred Smoot profile at SportsIllustrated.com.
 "Heavier, humbled Smoot still loud, still proud", NFL.com.
 Fred Smoot's Smack Energy Bar – Official Website, SmackEnergyBar.com.

1979 births
Living people
All-American college football players
American football cornerbacks
Hinds Eagles football players
Minnesota Vikings players
Mississippi State Bulldogs football players
Players of American football from Jackson, Mississippi
Washington Redskins players
Ed Block Courage Award recipients